Felipe López Gutiérrez (born 30 December 1995) is a Mexican footballer who plays as a goalkeeper.

References

1995 births
Living people
Mexican footballers
Association football goalkeepers
Leones Negros UdeG footballers
Ascenso MX players
Liga Premier de México players
Tercera División de México players
Footballers from Guadalajara, Jalisco